is a female judoka in Japan. She was born in Maebashi, Gunma.

History
She started judo when she was an elementary school student, influenced by her brother and father.

Prizes
She has won many prizes at Judo events all over the world.
Women's -52 kg category
2003 World Championship (in Osaka, Japan) - bronze medal
2004 Summer Olympics (in Athens, Greece) - silver medal
2004 Fukuoka International Women's Judo Championships (in Fukuoka, Japan) - 1st place

External links
 
 
 Women's Judo Club at Mitsui Sumitomo Insurance Co., Ltd.

1980 births
Living people
Japanese female judoka
Olympic judoka of Japan
Judoka at the 2004 Summer Olympics
Olympic silver medalists for Japan
People from Maebashi
Olympic medalists in judo
Asian Games medalists in judo
Medalists at the 2004 Summer Olympics
Judoka at the 2002 Asian Games
Judoka at the 2006 Asian Games
Asian Games bronze medalists for Japan
Medalists at the 2006 Asian Games